Telford may refer to:
 Telford (name), an English place name

Places 
 Telford, Victoria, Australia, a small locality
 Telford Cut, a coal mine in South Australia
 Telford Lake, Alberta, Canada
 Telford (UK Parliament constituency), England
 Telford, Shropshire, England, a town
 Telford, Pennsylvania, United States, a borough
 Telford, Tennessee, United States, a census-designated place
 Telford, Washington, United States, an unincorporated community
 Telford Plaza, a place in Hong Kong

Sport
A.F.C. Telford United, an English football team
Telford Raiders, an English rugby league team
Telford Tigers, an English ice hockey team
Telford United F.C., a defunct English football team

People and fictional characters
Telford (surname), a list of people and fictional characters
Thomas Telford (1757–1834), Scottish civil engineer and constructor of the Caledonian Canal, namesake of Telford, England 
Telford Taylor (1908–1998), American lawyer and brigadier general, prosecutor at the Nuremberg trials

Other uses
Telford (Southern Institute of Technology), vocational training school in Otago, New Zealand
Edinburgh's Telford College, Scotland, a further education college
Telford Medal, the highest prize awarded by the British Institution of Civil Engineers
Telford Shopping Centre, the commercial centre of the town of Telford, England
Telford FM, an English radio station